Joseph Xu may refer to:

Joseph Xu Zhixuan (1916–2008), Chinese Roman Catholic bishop
Joseph Xu Honggen (born 1962), Chinese Roman Catholic bishop

See also
Hsu King-shing (1910–1986), also known as Joseph Hsu, Chinese footballer and football manager
Xu Haiqiao (born 1983), also known as Joe Xu, Chinese actor